Kjeldstadli is a Norwegian surname. Notable people with the surname include:

Knut Kjeldstadli (born 1948), Norwegian historian, son of Sverre
Sverre Kjeldstadli (1916–1961), Norwegian historian

Norwegian-language surnames